Fastook Glacier is a southern tributary to Mulock Glacier about  long and  wide. It heads on the north side of Longhurst Plateau in the Cook Mountains and flows north between Butcher Ridge and the Finger Ridges. It was named after James L. Fastook of the Department of Computer Sciences and the Institute for Quaternary Studies at the University of Maine, a United States Antarctic Program investigator of ice streams, ice shelves, and ice sheets over a 20-year period beginning about 1978.

References 

Glaciers of Oates Land